Pachyrhinosaurini is a tribe of centrosaurine dinosaurs. The clade existed during the Late Cretaceous, about 83.6 to 68.5 million years ago, evolving during the early Campanian, and becoming extinct in the Maastrichtian. The tribe contains five genera: Styracosaurus, Stellasaurus, Einiosaurus, Achelousaurus, and Pachyrhinosaurus. Pachyrhinosaurus and Achelousaurus form the clade of pachyrhinosaurins called the Pachyrostra ("thick-snouts"), characterized primarily by their nasal bosses.

Classification
Pachyrhinosaurini was defined in 2012 by Fiorillo & Tykoski. It was defined as all centrosaurine ceratopsids more closely related to Pachyrhinosaurus canadensis than to Centrosaurus apertus. It was defined during the description of Pachyrhinosaurus perotorum, a species from Alaska.

The cladogram below represents the findings of Lund et al., 2016, in their description of Machairoceratops cronusi. Wendiceratops pinhornensis, Xenoceratops foremostensis, and Sinoceratops zhuchengensis were resolved as members of the Pachyrhinosaurini and Einiosaurus was resolved as a pachyrostran and the sister taxon of Achelousaurus.

 

The cladogram below represents a more recent phylogenetic analysis that included Pachyrhinosaurini by Chiba et al. (2017). Wendiceratops, Xenoceratops, and Sinoceratops were not resolved as members of the Pachyrhinosaurini and Einiosaurus was not resolved as a pachyrostran.

See also

 Timeline of ceratopsian research

References

Centrosaurines